Enerhia or Enerhiya is an alternative of more common Energia. In some countries of the Central and Eastern Europe the sharp g phoneme is used interchangeably with the more "deaf" (less noticeable) h phoneme.

It may refer to:
FC Enerhiya Nova Kakhovka, a Ukrainian football team
FC Enerhiya Yuzhnoukrainsk, a Ukrainian football team
FC Enerhiya Mykolaiv, a Ukrainian football team

See also 
Energy (disambiguation)
Energie (disambiguation)
Energia (disambiguation)